Compton Down is a hill on the Isle of Wight just to the east of Freshwater Bay. It is part of the chalk ridge which forms the "backbone" of the Isle of Wight. The Down is owned and managed by the National Trust and it provides the setting for the Freshwater Bay Golf Course at its western end.

It is a  Site of special scientific interest. The site was notified in 1951 for both its biological and geological features.

References

Natural England citation sheet

Sites of Special Scientific Interest on the Isle of Wight
Hills of the Isle of Wight
National Trust properties on the Isle of Wight